Adams Township is a township in Delaware County, Iowa, USA.  As of the 2000 census, its population was 781.

Geography
Adams Township covers an area of 36.27 square miles (93.94 square kilometers).

Cities and towns
 Ryan

Unincorporated towns
 Ehler
 Robinson
(This list is based on USGS data and may include former settlements.)

Adjacent townships
 Prairie Township (north)
 Milo Township (northeast)
 Hazel Green Township (east)
 Boulder Township, Linn County (southeast)
 Jackson Township, Linn County (south)
 Spring Grove Township, Linn County (southwest)
 Newton Township, Buchanan County (west)
 Middlefield Township, Buchanan County (northwest)

Cemeteries
The township contains two cemeteries: Pleasant Hill and Silver Creek.

Major highways

References
 U.S. Board on Geographic Names (GNIS)
 United States Census Bureau cartographic boundary files

External links
 US-Counties.com
 City-Data.com

Townships in Delaware County, Iowa
Townships in Iowa